Friedrich Hermann Schottky (24 July 1851 – 12 August 1935) was a German mathematician who worked on elliptic, abelian, and theta functions and introduced Schottky groups and Schottky's theorem. He was born in Breslau, Germany (now Wrocław, Poland) and died in Berlin. Schottky was a professor at the University of Zurich from 1882-1892.

He is also the father of Walter H. Schottky, the German physicist and inventor of a variety of semiconductor concepts.

See also
Prime form
Prym variety
Walter H. Schottky

External links
 
 

1851 births
1935 deaths
19th-century German mathematicians
20th-century German mathematicians
Scientists from Wrocław
People from the Province of Silesia
Academic staff of ETH Zurich
German expatriates in Switzerland